Frank E. Hughes (June 14, 1893 – April 26, 1947) was an American set decorator. He won an Academy Award and was nominated for another in the category Best Art Direction.

Selected filmography
Hughes won an Academy Award for Best Art Direction and was nominated for another:
Won
 Anna and the King of Siam (1946)
Nominated
 The Keys of the Kingdom (1944)

References

External links

American set decorators
Best Art Direction Academy Award winners
1893 births
1947 deaths